Extrusion in food processing consists of forcing soft mixed ingredients through an opening in a perforated plate or die designed to produce the required shape. The extruded food is then cut to a specific size by blades. The machine which forces the mix through the die is an extruder, and the mix is known as the extrudate. The extruder is typically a large, rotating screw tightly fitting within a stationary barrel, at the end of which is the die.

Extrusion enables mass production of food via a continuous, efficient system that ensures uniformity of the final product. Food products manufactured using extrusion usually have a high starch content. These include some pasta, breads (croutons, bread sticks, and flat breads), many breakfast cereals and ready-to-eat snacks, confectionery, pre-made cookie dough, some baby foods, full-fat soy, textured vegetable protein, some beverages, and dry and semi-moist pet foods.

Process

In the extrusion process, raw materials are first ground to the correct particle size, usually the consistency of coarse flour. The dry mix is passed through a pre-conditioner, in which other ingredients are added depending on the target product; these may be liquid sugar, fats, dyes, meats or water. Steam is injected to start the cooking process, and the preconditioned mix (extrudate) is then passed through an extruder. The extruder is a large, rotating screw tightly fitting within a stationary barrel, at the end of which is the die. The extruder's rotating screw forces the extrudate towards and through the die. The extrudate is in the extruder for the residence time.

Many extruded products puff and change texture as they are extruded because of the reduction of forces and release of moisture and heat. The extent to which it does so is known as the expansion ratio. The extrudate is cut to the desired length by blades at the output of the extruder, which rotate about the die openings at a specific speed. The product is then cooled and dried, becoming rigid while maintaining porosity.

Cooking takes place within the extruder, where the product produces its own friction and heat due to the pressure generated (10–20 bar). The process can induce both protein denaturation and starch gelatinization under some conditions.

Many food extrusion processes involve a high temperature for a short time. Important factors of the extrusion process are the composition of the extrudate, screw length and rotating speed, barrel temperature and moisture, die shape, and rotating speed of the blades. These are controlled based on the desired product to ensure uniformity of the output.

Moisture is the most important of these factors, and affects the mix viscosity, acting to plasticize the extrudate. Increasing moisture will decrease viscosity, torque, and product temperature, and increase bulk density. This will also reduce the pressure at the die. Most extrusion processes for food processing are carried out at low to intermediate moisture (moisture level below 40%). High-moisture extrusion is known as wet extrusion, but it was not used much before the introduction of twin screw extruders (TSE), which have a more efficient conveying capability. The most important rheological factor in the wet extrusion of high-starch extrudate is temperature.

The amount of salt in the extrudate may determine the colour and texture of some extruded products. The expansion ratio and airiness of the product depend on the salt concentration in the extrudate, possibly as a result of a chemical reaction between the salt and the starches in the extrudate. Colour changes as a result of salt concentration may be caused by "the ability of salt to change the water activity of the extrudate and thus change the rate of browning reactions". Salt is also used to distribute minor ingredients, such as food colours and flavours, after extrusion; these are more evenly distributed over the product's surface after being mixed with salt.

History

The first extruder was designed to manufacture sausages in the 1870s. Dry pasta and breakfast cereals have been produced by extrusion since the 1930s, and the method has been applied to pet food production since the 1950s (first extruded dog food: Purina Dog Chow in 1957, and first extruded cat food: Purina Friskies in 1962). Some domestic kitchen appliances such as meat grinders and some types of pasta makers use extrusion. Pastry bags (piping bags), squeezed by hand, operate by extrusion.

Effects
Extrusion enables mass production of food via a continuous, efficient system that ensures uniformity of the final product. This is achieved by controlling various aspects of the extrusion process. It has also enabled the production of new processed food products and "revolutionized many conventional snack manufacturing processes".
The extrusion process results in "chemical reactions that occur within the extruder barrel and at the die". Extrusion has the following effects:
 Destruction of certain naturally occurring toxins
 Reduction of microorganisms in the final product
 Slight increase of iron-bioavailability
 Creation of insulin-desensitizing starches (a potential risk-factor for developing diabetes)
 Loss of lysine, an essential amino acid necessary for developmental growth and nitrogen management
 Simplification of complex starches, increasing rates of tooth decay
 Increase of glycemic index of the processed food, as the "extrusion process significantly increased the availability of carbohydrates for digestion"
 Destruction of Vitamin A (beta-carotene)
 Denaturation of proteins.

The material of which an extrusion die is made can affect the final product. Rough bronze dies on pasta extruders produce a rougher surface than smooth stainless steel dies, considered to make more liquid pasta sauces adhere better; pasta made this way is labelled "bronze die" pasta to indicate a premium product.

The effects of "extrusion cooking on nutritional quality are ambiguous", as extrusion may change carbohydrates, dietary fibre, the protein and amino acid profile, vitamins, and mineral content of the extrudate in a manner that is beneficial or harmful.

High-temperature extrusion for a short duration "minimizes losses in vitamins and amino acids". Extrusion enables mass production of some food, and will "denature antinutritional factors", such as destroying toxins or killing microorganisms. It may also improve "protein quality and digestibility", and affects the product's shape, texture, colour, and flavour.

It may also cause the fragmentation of proteins, starches, and non-starch polysaccharides to create "reactive molecules that may form new linkages not found in nature". This includes Maillard reactions which reduce the nutritional value of the proteins. Vitamins with heat lability may be destroyed. , little is known about the stability or bioavailability of phytochemicals involved in extrusion. Nutritional quality has been found to improve with moderate conditions (short duration, high moisture, low temperature), whereas a negative effect on nutritional quality of the extrudate occurs with a high temperature (at least 200 °C), low moisture (less than 15%), or improper components in the mix.

A 2012 research paper indicates that use of non-traditional cereal flours, such as amaranth, buckwheat or millet, may be used to reduce the glycemic index of breakfast cereals produced by extrusion. The extrudate using these cereal flours exhibits a higher bulk and product density, has a similar expansion ratio, and has "a significant reduction in readily digestible carbohydrates and slowly digestible carbohydrates". A 2008 paper states that replacing 5% to 15% of the wheat flour and white flour with dietary fibre in the extrudate breakfast cereal mix significantly reduces "the rate and extent of carbohydrate hydrolysis of the extruded products", which increased the level of slowly digested carbohydrates and reduced the level of quickly digested carbohydrates.

Products
Extrusion has enabled the production of new processed food products and "revolutionized many conventional snack manufacturing processes".

The various types of food products manufactured by extrusion typically have a high starch content.  Directly expanded types include breakfast cereals and corn curls, and are made in high temperature, low moisture conditions under high shear. Unexpanded products include pasta, which is produced at intermediate moisture (about 40%) and low temperature. Texturized products include meat analogues, which are made using plant proteins ("textured vegetable protein") and a long die to "impart a fibrous, meat-like structure to the extrudate", and fish paste. Confectionery made via extrusion includes chewing gum, liquorice, and toffee.

Some processed cheeses and cheese analogues are also made by extrusion. Processed cheeses extruded with low moisture and temperature "might be better suited for manufacturing using extrusion technology" than those at high moisture or temperature. Lower moisture cheeses are firmer and chewier, and cheddar cheese with low moisture and an extrusion temperature of 80 °C was preferred by subjects in a study to other extruded cheddar cheese produced under different conditions. An extrudate mean residence time of about 100 seconds can produce "processed cheeses or cheese analogues of varying texture (spreadable to sliceable)".

Other food products often produced by extrusion include some breads (croutons, bread sticks, and flat breads), various ready-to-eat snacks, pre-made cookie dough, some baby foods, some beverages, and dry and semi-moist pet foods. Specific examples include cheese curls, macaroni, Fig Newtons, jelly beans, sevai, and some french fries. Extrusion is also used to modify starch and to pellet animal feed.

See also
 Flash pasteurization

References

Further reading

 
 
 

Food industry
Forming processes